Sir Denis Seward Laskey  (18 January 1916 – 16 October 1987) was British ambassador to Romania and Austria.

Career
Denis Seward Laskey was educated at Marlborough College and Corpus Christi College, Oxford. He joined the Foreign Office in 1939, served briefly in the British Army 1940–41, then returned to the Foreign Office until the end of the war, when he was posted to Berlin and later to the UK delegation to the United Nations in New York. He was Principal Private Secretary to the Foreign Secretary (Selwyn Lloyd) 1956–59, Minister (second to the Ambassador) at Rome 1960–64, Permanent Under-Secretary at the Cabinet Office 1964–67, Minister at Bonn 1967–68, Ambassador to Romania 1969–71 and Ambassador to Austria 1972–75.

Laskey was appointed CMG in the 1957 New Year Honours , CVO in the 1958 Birthday Honours and knighted KCMG in the 1974 New Year Honours.

References

LASKEY, Sir Denis (Seward) , Who Was Who, A & C Black, 1920–2007; online edn, Oxford University Press, Dec 2012
Sir Denis Laskey (obituary), The Times, London, 19 October 1987, page 18

1916 births
1987 deaths
People educated at Marlborough College
Alumni of Corpus Christi College, Oxford
British Army personnel of World War II
Principal Private Secretaries to the Secretary of State for Foreign and Commonwealth Affairs
Ambassadors of the United Kingdom to Romania
Ambassadors of the United Kingdom to Austria
Knights Commander of the Order of St Michael and St George
Commanders of the Royal Victorian Order